Ride Tonight! (Swedish: Rid i natt) is a 1942 Swedish historical drama film directed by Gustaf Molander and starring Lars Hanson, Oscar Ljung, Gerd Hagman and Eva Dahlbeck. It is an adaptation of the 1941 novel Ride This Night by Vilhelm Moberg. The film, like the original novel, alluded directly to events in occupied Europe during the Second World War and helped to bolster anti-Nazi sentiment in neutral Sweden.

Synopsis
In 17th century Southern Sweden, a peasant uprising takes place against German landowners.

Partial cast
 Lars Hanson as Jon Stånge
 Oscar Ljung as Ragnar Svedje of Svedjegaarden 
 Gerd Hagman as Annika 
 Eva Dahlbeck as Botilla 
 Erik 'Bullen' Berglund as Lars Borre 
 Hilda Borgström as Mother Sigga 
 Nils Lundell as Ygge, the thief of Bläsemåla 
 Erik Hell as Hans of Lenhovda 
 Hugo Björne as Petrus Magni 
 Sven Bergvall as Archbishop 
 Carl Ström as Klas Bock 
 Gunnar Sjöberg as Foreign peasant 
 Hampe Faustman as Bo Eriksson 
 Josua Bengtson as Danjel, inn-keeper 
 Axel Högel as Ola of Klavmo 
 Gunnar Collin as Matts Elling, peasant
 Signe Lundberg-Settergren as Housewife

References

Bibliography
 Winkel, Roel Vande & Welch, David. Cinema and the Swastika: The International Expansion of the Third Reich. Palgrave MacMillan, 2011.

External links

 

1942 films
Swedish historical drama films
1940s historical drama films
1940s Swedish-language films
Films directed by Gustaf Molander
Films set in the 17th century
Films based on Swedish novels
Films based on works by Vilhelm Moberg
Swedish black-and-white films
1942 drama films
1940s Swedish films